The Höhi Wispile (also spelled Höji Wispile) is a mountain of the Bernese Alps, overlooking Gstaad in the canton of Bern. It lies on the range separating the main Saane valley from the Lauenen valley, north of the Spitzhorn.

The summit can easily be reached by a cable car from Gstaad.

In the winter, people visit the mountain for its ski slopes and in the summer it is popular for hikes to Lake Lauenen.

See also
List of mountains of Switzerland accessible by public transport

References

External links
Höhi Wispile on Gstaad.ch
Höhi Wispile on Hikr.org

Mountains of the Alps
Mountains of Switzerland
Mountains of the canton of Bern
One-thousanders of Switzerland